Pedro Regueiro Pagola ( 19 December 1909 – 11 June 1985) was a Spanish footballer who played as a midfielder.

Football career
Born in Irun in the Basque Country, Regueiro  started his playing career at Real Unión in 1925. He moved for one season to Real Betis in 1929, after which he returned to Real Unión for two more seasons. In 1932 he moved to Real Madrid where he played with his older brother Luis Regueiro.

In 1937 and 1938, during the Spanish Civil War in his homeland, he played for the Basque representative team which toured Europe and the Americas, ending up in Mexico where he initially played for Club Deportivo Euzkadi (The Basque exiles' team) in the Primera Fuerza league for the 1938–39 season. He then joined Mexican side Club Asturias where he played with his younger brother Tomás Regueiro, and helped the club win the first championship of the newly created Mexican Primera División (1943–44).

Personal life
In 1939 Regueiro settled in Mexico, where he married Peri Romero in 1943 and had four children: Pedro, Mari Carmen, María Eugenia and José.

References 

1909 births
1985 deaths
Footballers from the Basque Country (autonomous community)
Association football midfielders
La Liga players
Expatriate footballers in Mexico
Spain international footballers
Spanish expatriate footballers
Real Betis players
Real Unión footballers
Real Madrid CF players
Spanish footballers
Sportspeople from Irun
Spanish expatriate sportspeople in Mexico
Liga MX players
Spanish emigrants to Mexico
Basque Country international footballers